Rhea Mitchell was an American actress and writer who came to prominence during the silent film era, appearing in numerous pictures in the early-1910s. Her first major featured role was in Reginald Barker's Western On the Night Stage (1915), followed by a supporting part in Barker's The Devil, adapted by Thomas Ince (also 1915). The same year, she had a supporting role in the serial film The Diamond from the Sky, co-starring with Lottie Pickford.

After the advent of sound films, Mitchell continued to work sporadically, though most her performances were uncredited. In 1927, she wrote two feature films, including The Home Trail, directed by William Wyler. Some of her later acting credits include Green Dolphin Street (1947), State of the Union (1948), and Stars in My Crown (1950). She retired in 1952, after which she spent her remaining years managing apartment buildings in Los Angeles. She was murdered by a disgruntled tenant in 1957.

Film

References

Sources

External links

Actress filmographies
American filmographies